School District 57 Prince George (SD 57) is a school district in central British Columbia that encompasses urban Prince George, its surroundings, and the outlying communities of McBride and Valemount to the southeast, and Mackenzie to the north.

History

Overview
Land developers organized and sponsored the first schools within Prince George. By 1914, one high and three elementary schools existed. Within the area of what would become SD 57, the establishment of separate school districts (usually comprising a single school), totalled 9 in 1911–1920, 17 in 1921–1930, and 11 in 1931–1940. During the Great Depression, centralization increased because local boards abrogated their responsibilities, forcing the installation of official trustees and creating larger administrative units.

Attracting and retaining qualified rural teachers proved difficult. Factors included salaries, scathing inspectors, isolation, community factions, no running water, no electricity, inadequate heat, teaching multiple grades, and sometimes an expectation to organize the various children's social activities for the community at large. Rural schools were dependent upon a smaller and volatile local tax base for funding. When an economic downturn, fire, or depleted accessible timber, closed a sawmill (the primary employer in most rural communities), workers relocated, student numbers dropped, and the tax base collapsed.

Rural school buildings were usually rudimentary, and many in a poor state of repair. Equipment and supplies were limited.  Consequently, rural students, receiving the barest elementary programs, lacked educational opportunities, and few progressed to a secondary school offered only by a main centre.

The 1946 implementation of the 1945 Cameron Report into BC school financing and administration created centralized larger districts. Benefits to rural schools were a broader tax base, to Prince George schools an augmentation of existing infrastructure, and to all schools an increase in provincial funding from 30 to 50 percent. The earlier municipal districts provided no guidance as to setting boundaries, because many were quite small, and 90 percent of the province was unorganized. The new Prince George school district boundaries were equidistant between Quesnel southward, Vanderhoof westward, and at Penny southeastward. On the disbanding of local boards, the former Prince George one, comprising members of civic and economic stature, became the interim board. The elected 1948 board comprised four city and three rural representatives, reaffirming some degree of local control.

The new board did not operate with complete autonomy, but had to avail itself of the experience, training, and knowledge of local inspectors of schools, who represented the province. The latter, who had been regarded as faultfinders by local trustees, became mentors aligned with the centralized trustees. The board became a buffer between local residents and the province, and the inspectors were freed from petty management issues.

Burgeoning student numbers throughout the 1950s saw massive increases in teacher recruitment and classroom capacity. Many new schools served residential development along the new highways north and west. However by the mid 1950s, building remote rural schools rarely occurred because of maintenance challenges, and from the late 1950s, numerous schools closed as mills closed.

In 1970, SD 58 Mc Bride merged into SD 57, and its board dissolved. The new enlarged school district matches the boundaries of the Regional District of Fraser-Fort George.

Board of trustees and superintendents

Schools

Enrolment

See also
List of school districts in British Columbia
Prince George Youth Containment

Footnotes

References

 

57
Education in Prince George, British Columbia